Yevgeni Valeryevich Kharin (born 11 June 1995) is a Russian professional football player who plays as a left midfielder for FC Akhmat Grozny.

Club career
On 8 August 2018, Kharin signed a four-year contract with FC Akhmat Grozny. On 2 June 2022, he signed a new three-year contract with Akhmat.

International career
Because he was born in Estonia, he is eligible to represent Russia or Estonia, although he has not received any invitation from either federation.

Career statistics

Club

References

External links

1995 births
People from Harju County
Living people
Russian footballers
Estonian footballers
Association football midfielders
Russian expatriate footballers
Expatriate footballers in Estonia
Estonian expatriate footballers
Expatriate footballers in Russia
FCI Tallinn players
FCI Levadia Tallinn players
FC Akhmat Grozny players
Meistriliiga players
Russian Premier League players
Estonian people of Russian descent